Small Town Security is an American reality television series produced by Ken Druckerman and Banks Tarver from Left/Right Productions for the AMC network. The unscripted show focused on a small, family-owned, private security company called JJK Security, located in the North Georgia city of Ringgold.

The show, green-lit along with Comic Book Men, was picked up for a season of eight half-hour episodes and premiered after the season 5 premiere of Breaking Bad on July 15, 2012. A second season of eight half-hour episodes started on May 9, 2013. The eight-episode third season premiered on May 6, 2014.

On October 10, 2014, AMC announced that Small Town Security had been canceled and would not be returning for a fourth season.

Cast

Joan Koplan (The Chief): Head of JJK Security and former actress/public access television host. Joan Koplan died on March 31, 2016.
Dennis Starr Croft (The Captain): Joan's live-in lieutenant who later became Captain
Irwin Koplan (The Major): Joan's husband
Brian Taylor (Office Manager): The company's detective, process server, and business manager
Christa Stephens (Secretary): The office secretary who is also a "licensed cosmetologist"
Lambchop: Joan's feisty 14-year-old chihuahua
Charlotte: Lambchop's replacement, after Lambchop became ill and had to be euthanized

Production
In a July 2012 interview with Hollywood.com, series star and JJK Security owner Joan Koplan explained how the series came to television: "I've had people coming into my office for a long time saying how crazy it is and how it should be a reality show. I knew Matt Saul from William Morris Endeavor [talent agency], so I called him and asked if he'd be interested in doing something. He said we'd have to make a DVD, so I did that. After he saw it he said, 'Yeah, I see what you mean, that's a crazy place.' About four days later, he calls and tells me that Ken Druckerman from Left/Right Productions in New York City is interested in it. I almost crapped my pants." When Joan was asked about audience reaction to Lieutenant Croft's transgender secret being revealed on her public access show and, subsequently, on network television, she said: "Keep in mind, this is the Bible Belt. Some people—well, nobody was rude, I will tell you that. But some people felt very sorry for him. But there was a lot of understanding. I got very few calls that were derogatory." In an interview with The Advocate, Croft also responded about the feedback: "I haven't really felt a change. Those who know me and about me haven't flinched. I found that surprising. It has not been what I expected of others, and I see that folks are not the typical haters of my kind that I thought. The South has grown up from the childish games of prejudice."

Reception

Critical reception
Small Town Security has received mixed reviews from critics. Boston.com blogger Frazier Moore observed that the series "bristles with authenticity", adding, "Part of the secret to the show's success is this: The characters regularly own up to their quirkiness, but without flaunting it for the cameras. They share without showing off. And what they reveal is much more than stereotypes. This makes the viewer not a voyeur, but a privileged onlooker."  Pete Vonder Haar of the Houston Press stated there was "nothing redeeming" about the series, calling it "depressing" and he added: "AMC seems to think it has something 'quirky' and 'off the wall.' In reality (no pun intended) it feels like something the North Korean government broadcasts to sap its citizens' will to live."

In the New York Magazine's "Approval Matrix" for the week of May 27, 2013, the series was given a "lowbrow brilliant" rating, stating that it was "regularly enjoyable."

Awards
In 2014, Small Town Security was nominated for a GLAAD Media Award for Outstanding Reality Program for fairly and accurately representing the LGBT community and its relevant issues. It was also nominated in 2013.

Series overview

Episodes

Season 1 (2012)

Season 2 (2013)

Season 3 (2014)

References

External links

2012 American television series debuts
2014 American television series endings
2010s American reality television series
AMC (TV channel) original programming
English-language television shows